In Spain, the legal designation Conjunto histórico (formerly Conjunto Histórico-Artístico or "Historic-Artistic Grouping") is part of the national system of heritage listing.  It is applied to buildings in a given locality. It is typically used to protect complete villages, such as Peñaranda de Duero, or historic quarters of towns such as Avilés.

Conjunto means "group", and as a group listing, the Conjunto histórico is comparable with the British concept of a Conservation Area. 
Conjunto histórico is a sub-category within a broader category of Bien de Interés Cultural, which protects Spain's cultural heritage and is regulated by the country's Ministry of Culture. As well as conjuntos históricos, the category of Bien de Interés Cultural includes the following sub-categories of non-movable heritage:
 Jardín histórico, historic garden (for example the gardens of Aranjuez)
 Monumento
 Sitio histórico (for example the Bulls of Guisando)
 Zona arqueológica, archaeological zone (for example the Archaeological Site of Atapuerca)

A Conjunto histórico may include buildings which are individually protected as monuments, as is the case at, for example, Peñaranda de Duero or Covarrubias.

Examples
Nogal de las Huertas (1931)
Avilés (1955)
Covarrubias (1965)
Sos del Rey Católico (1968)
Daroca (1968)
Sanlúcar de Barrameda (1973)
Peñaranda de Duero (1974)
Santa Cruz de La Palma (1975)
La Orotava (1976)
Garachico (1994)
Gumiel de Izán (2003)
Frías (2005)

See also
UNESCO World Heritage Site

Notes

External links
  "Patrimony and protected cultural goods", Ministry of Culture
  Guía de Conjuntos Histórico-Artísticos declarados en España.

Heritage registers in Spain
Urban planning in Spain
Architecture in Spain
Cultural history of Spain